Malopurginsky District (Pići Purga joros) is an administrative and municipal district (raion), and one of the twenty-five in the Udmurt Republic, Russia. It is located in the south of the republic. Its administrative center is the rural locality (a selo) of Malaya Purga. Population:  31,558 (2002 Census);  The population of Malaya Purga accounts for 23.3% of the district's total population.

References

Notes

Sources

Districts of Udmurtia